S.S.P.G. College (Full name: Swami Shukdevanand Post Graduate College) is a college in Shahjahanpur district of Uttar Pradesh in India. The school is located at Mumukshu Ashram, near Garra river on Lucknow-Delhi National Highway No. 30. It is affiliated with MJP Rohilkhand University, Bareilly.

Founded in 1964 by Swami Shukdevanand Saraswati (1901-1965), S.S.P.G. College runs graduate and postgraduate courses in Faculties of Arts, Science, Commerce, Education and Computer Science.

See also
 Shahjahanpur

References

External links 
 

Educational institutions established in 1964
Postgraduate colleges in Uttar Pradesh
1964 establishments in Uttar Pradesh
Education in Shahjahanpur